Project Head Start may refer to:
The Head Start Program, an anti-poverty program of the United States
Operation Head Start, an operation of the United States Air Force